Slamboree '93: A Legends' Reunion was the inaugural Slamboree professional wrestling pay-per-view (PPV) event produced by World Championship Wrestling (WCW). It took place on May 23, 1993 at The Omni in Atlanta, Georgia.

Storylines
The event featured wrestlers from pre-existing scripted feuds and storylines. Wrestlers portrayed villains, heroes, or less distinguishable characters in the scripted events that built tension and culminated in a wrestling match or series of matches.

Event

At the event, Lou Thesz, Mr. Wrestling II, Verne Gagne, and Eddie Graham were inducted into the WCW Hall of Fame. Additionally, Ole Anderson, The Assassin, Ox Baker, Red Bastien, Lord James Blears, The Crusher, The Fabulous Moolah, Greg Gagne, Bob Geigel, Stu Hart, Magnum T. A., Bugsy McGraw, Don Owen, Dusty Rhodes, Grizzly Smith, John Tolos, Mad Dog Vachon and Johnny Valentine were also honoured during a "Legends Ceremony".

The event also saw the reformation of the Four Horsemen, now consisting of Ric Flair, Arn Anderson, Ole Anderson, and new member Paul Roma.

It also saw Sid Vicious return to WCW, following a stint in the World Wrestling Federation.

The card underwent several changes, as Brad Armstrong replaced his father Bob Armstrong in the Legends Tag Team Match and The Prisoner replaced Scott Norton in the Bounty Match with Sting. In the WCW/NWA World Tag Team Championship steel cage match, Tom Zenk replaced Shane Douglas as Ricky Steamboat's partner in the masked Dos Hombres team. However, the announcers pretended throughout the match that Steamboat's partner was Douglas.

Results

References

External links 
 

1993
Events in Atlanta
1993 in Georgia (U.S. state)
Professional wrestling in Atlanta
1993 World Championship Wrestling pay-per-view events
May 1993 events in the United States